IRNSS-1B is the second out of seven in the Indian Regional Navigation Satellite System (IRNSS) series of satellites after IRNSS-1A. The IRNSS constellation of satellites is slated to be launched to provide navigational services to the region. It was placed in geosynchronous orbit on 4 April 2014.

Satellite 
The satellite will help augmenting the satellite based navigation system of India which is currently under development. The navigational system so developed will be a regional one targeted towards South Asia. The satellite will provide navigation, tracking and mapping services.

IRNSS-1B satellite has two payloads: a navigation payload and CDMA ranging payload in addition with a laser retro-reflector. The payload generates navigation signals at L5 and S-band. The design of the payload makes the IRNSS system interoperable and compatible with Global Positioning System (GPS) and Galileo. The satellite is powered by two solar arrays, which generate power up to 1,660 watts, and has a life-time of ten years.

Launch 
The 1,432 kg satellite  was launched on 4 April 2014 at 11:44 UTC (17:14 IST) aboard the PSLV-C24 rocket from Satish Dhawan Space Centre, Sriharikota.

See also 

 Communication-Centric Intelligence Satellite (CCI-Sat)
 GPS-aided geo-augmented navigation (GAGAN)
 Satellite navigation
 2014 in spaceflight

References

External links 
 ISRO Future Programmes
 Updates

2014 in India
Spacecraft launched in 2014
IRNSS satellites
Spacecraft launched by PSLV rockets